Young (formerly known as Young Turks) is a British independent record label that sits in the Beggars Group of labels launched by Caius Pawson in 2006. It has grown from an imprint of XL Recordings into a successful and influential label now partnered with XL and operates across a range of genres. The label's current roster includes The xx, FKA twigs, Sampha, Jamie xx, Koreless and Kamasi Washington.

History
In 2004, Caius Pawson supplied DJs and sound equipment for a series of all-night dance parties he called Young Turks. He enjoyed growing celebrity, until the police raided one of his parties and seized his gear. Pawson, then nineteen, took a job in A&R at XL Recordings, and quickly established his own small label within the company in 2006, also called Young Turks with Katie O'Neill and Tic.

Eventually, Young became a 50/50 venture with XL Recordings. Young has now expanded to include an artist management company (Young Artists) and a publishing company (Young Songs).

In 2009, Young Turks released The xx's debut album, xx, which was awarded the Mercury Prize in 2010.

Name change
Pawson changed the name of the label from Young Turks to simply Young in April 2021. Pawson said he had named the label after the 1981 Rod Stewart song "Young Turks" and a British slang term for rebellious youth, but had been unaware of the early 20th century political movement that had originated the term and which had been involved with the Armenian genocide. Pawson wrote on Instagram "Through ongoing conversations and messages that have developed our own knowledge around the subject, it's become apparent that the name is a source of hurt and confusion for people. We loved the name for what it meant to us, but in retrospect should have listened more carefully to other voices and acted more quickly. We have always tried to affect positive change and knowing what we do now, it's only right that we change our name." Young announced they had made a donation of an undisclosed sum to the Armenian Institute in London in conjunction with the name change.

Current artists

Young 
 Daniela Lalita
 Ethan P. Flynn
 FKA twigs
 Jamie xx
 John Talabot
 Kamasi Washington
 Koreless
 Oliver Sim
 Romy
 Sampha
 The xx

Young Artists 
 Ethan P. Flynn
 Ging
 Jamie xx
 Koreless
 Mustafa
 Oliver Sim
 Robyn
 Romy
 Sampha
 The Haxan Cloak
 The xx

Young Songs 
 Arlo Parks
 Bkay
 Fred MacPherson
 Holly Fletcher (Låpsley)
 Koreless
 Kwes Darko
 Sampha

Catalogue artists

AD 93
AD 93 is a record label affiliated with Young, headed by DJ Nic Tasker. Originally formed as a white label imprint for Young artists (formerly Young Turks, YT) under the name 'Whities', this imprint grown into a label in itself. The label focuses on club music, techno and experimental electronic music and is distributed by Rush Hour. in June 2020, this label's name changed to 'AD 93' in light of the 2020 Black Lives Matter uprisings. The label also launched a sub-label in 2021 named Lith Dolina.

Discography

Selected releases

See also
 XL Recordings
 List of record labels
 List of electronic music record labels
 List of independent UK record labels

References

External links
Young official website
 
AD 93 official website

Record labels established in 2006
Electronic music record labels
Electronic dance music record labels
British independent record labels
Indie rock record labels
Beggars Group
2000 establishments in the United Kingdom